The Great German Pilgrimage of 1064–1065 was a large pilgrimage to Jerusalem which took place a generation before the First Crusade.

It originated in the Kingdom of Germany in 1064, and was led by Archbishop Siegfried of Mainz, Bishop William of Utrecht, Bishop Otto of Ratisbon (modern-day Regensburg), and Bishop Gunther of Bamberg. There were between seven and twelve thousand pilgrims on the journey. The pilgrimage passed through Hungary, Bulgaria, Patzinakia, and Constantinople, just as the First Crusade would over thirty years later, with similar results: the pilgrims were treated harshly wherever they went, and were ushered off into Anatolia once they reached Constantinople.

They passed through Anatolia, which had not yet been conquered by the Seljuk Turks, as it was by the time of the crusade. Their troubles increased when they reached Latakia; there they met other pilgrims who warned them of the dangers to the south, and when they reached Tripoli, Lebanon, they were attacked by the emir of the city, but were saved by a storm which they regarded as a miracle.

On Holy Thursday they reached Caesarea, and on Good Friday they were attacked by Bedouin bandits. According to the longer version of the Annals of Altaich William of Utrecht was killed in battle, (although he actually survived and lived until 1076). The pilgrims fled to a nearby fort. On Easter Sunday the Bedouin leaders met with Gunther there and agreed to a truce, but the Bedouins threatened to kill the pilgrims anyway. Gunther had them killed and hung over the walls as a deterrent to further attacks.

On Easter Monday the Fatimid governor of Ramla drove off the Bedouins and freed the pilgrims, who then rested in Ramla for two weeks. They arrived in Jerusalem on April 12. After thirteen days they returned to Ramla, and later took ships back to Latakia and returned to Germany.

Sources
Annales Altahenses Maiores, 8, a. 1065, MGH, SS. XX. 815–17, trans. James Brundage, "The Crusades: A Documentary History", (Milwaukee, WI: Marquette University Press, 1962) (online)
Einar Joranson, 'The Great German Pilgrimage of 1064-1065', in The Crusades and Other Historical Essays Presented to Dana C. Munro by his Former Students, ed. Louis J. Paetow (New York: Crofts, 1928), pp. 3–43.

Christian pilgrimages
1064 in Europe
1065 in Europe
1060s in the Holy Roman Empire
1060s in the Byzantine Empire
1064 in Asia
1065 in Asia
11th century in the Fatimid Caliphate
11th-century Christianity